klj is the ISO 639 code for the Khalaj language

KLJ may refer to a series of aircraft radars (see KLJ-5 and KLJ-7).